Harold Morrison (January 30, 1931 - December 21, 1993) was an American country music singer-songwriter and session musician. He played banjo, dobro, and guitar on albums with musicians such as Loretta Lynn, Kitty Wells, The Wilburn Brothers, and Tammy Wynette. Throughout his musical career, Morrison was a cast member and recurring guest on multiple country music television shows, such as the Ozark Jubilee, the "Wilburn Brothers Show", and The Porter Wagoner Show.

Biography

Early life
Harold Ralph Morrison was born on January 30, 1931, in High Lonesome, a rural town in Christian County, Missouri, forty miles southeast of Springfield. His father was a farm laborer and his mother was a housewife. Morrison began playing banjo and guitar at an early age.

Career
In 1950, Morrison began performing on local radio stations in Springfield, and by 1951 he was performing as a duo with fiddler and guitarist Jimmy Gateley. They worked with the Red River Rustlers on KJSB radio in Jamestown, North Dakota. Later they moved to Wheeling, West Virginia, where they worked with WWVA (AM) radio. During this time, they occasionally performed with Dusty Owens' music group. In 1954, they recorded sessions with Owens' band for Columbia Records before returning to Springfield in 1955 to join the cast of the Ozark Jubilee. In 1955, Morrison and Gateley also went on tour with Red Foley. During this time, Morrison performed as a session musician for several studios, playing steel guitar with The Browns on their recording of "I Take the Chance", as well as playing the banjo on multiple Porter Wagoner songs.

By 1957, Morrison and his family relocated to Nashville, Tennessee, where he performed on the steel guitar and dobro with Kitty Wells on several Decca recordings, including her version of "I Can't Stop Loving You". He also recorded with Johnnie Wright for RCA Victor. Morrison was a touring member of both Wells's and Wright's bands. In the early 1960s, he became a member of The Wilburn Brothers, touring with them and co-hosting their television series, "The Wilburn Brothers Show". In the mid-1960s, Morrison recorded instrumental work and comedy routines for Decca Records, which were compiled and released as "Hoss, He's the Boss" in 1965. That year, he played the banjo on Loretta Lynn's song "Blue Kentucky Girl". Two years later, in 1967, he performed with the Maple Hill Boys, releasing the single "Opry Theme" under Epic records. It was the first time the Grand Ole Opry had allowed its theme to be recorded. In 1969, Morrison became a member of George Jones and Tammy Wynette's band, touring with them until their 1975 split. After 1975, Morrison continued touring with Wynette's band. In the early 1970s, Morrison was an occasional guest on The Porter Wagoner Show.

In 1975, Morrison, his daughter Karla, and Benny Williams formed the Smoking Cigarettes bluegrass music group. The group went on tour for several years, appearing at many of the larger bluegrass festivals and winning several competitions. After the group broke up, Morrison continued playing with several different groups. In 1985, Morrison performed under his own name in Branson, Missouri. In 1989, he played with Ferlin Husky, performing at their theater in Myrtle Beach, South Carolina until Hurricane Hugo destroyed the building. He then played with Grandpa Jones for a few years. In 1992, Morrison formed another band under his own name.

Death
Morrison died of heart failure on December 21, 1993, in Springfield, Missouri following a cerebral hemorrhage. He was 62 years old.

Discography

References

External links
 

American banjoists
Acoustic guitarists
Steel guitarists
American country singer-songwriters

1931 births
1993 deaths